The 2011 TEAN International was a professional tennis tournament played on hard courts. It was the 16th edition of the tournament which was part of the 2011 ATP Challenger Tour and the 11th edition of the tournament for the 2011 ITF Women's Circuit. It took place in Alphen aan den Rijn, Netherlands between 5 and 11 September 2011.

ATP singles main-draw entrants

Seeds

 1 Rankings are as of August 29, 2011.

Other entrants
The following players received wildcards into the singles main draw:
  Alban Meuffels
  Antal van der Duim
  Nick van der Meer
  Boy Westerhof

The following players received entry from the qualifying draw:
  Alexandre Folie
  James McGee
  Lennert van der Linden
  Roman Vögeli

WTA entrants

Seeds

 1 Rankings are as of August 29, 2011.

Other entrants
The following players received wildcards into the singles main draw:
  Daniëlle Harmsen
  Lesley Kerkhove
  Angelique van der Meet
  Kelly Versteeg

The following players received entry from the qualifying draw:
  Albina Khabibulina
  Ksenia Kirillova
  Ilona Kremen
  Justine Ozga
  Lisanne van Riet
  Carina Witthöft
  Zuzana Zálabská
  Nina Zander

The following players received entry by a lucky loser spot:
  Josanne van Bennekom

Champions

Men's singles

 Igor Sijsling def.  Jan-Lennard Struff, 7–6(7–2), 6–3

Women's singles

 Stephanie Vogt def.  Katarzyna Piter, 6–2, 6–4

Men's doubles

 Thiemo de Bakker /  Antal van der Duim def.  Matwé Middelkoop /  Igor Sijsling, 6–4, 6–7(4–7), [10–6]

Women's doubles

 Diana Enache /  Daniëlle Harmsen def.  Katarzyna Piter /  Barbara Sobaszkiewicz, 6–2, 6–7(4–7), [11–9]

External links
Official Website
ITF Search Men's
ITF Search Women's 
ATP official site

TEAN International
TEAN International
TEAN International
2011 in Dutch tennis